The Art Directors Guild Award for Excellence in Production Design for a Contemporary Film is one of the annual awards given by the Art Directors Guild starting from 2000.

Winners and nominees
Movies marked with a dagger (†) won the Academy Award for Best Production Design. Movies marked with a double dagger (‡) were Academy Award nominees.

2000s

2010s

2020s

References

Art Directors Guild Awards
2000s in American cinema
2010s in American cinema